Vitaliy Romanovych Mykhayliv (born 11 October 2005) is a Ukrainian professional footballer who plays as an attacking midfielder for Lviv.

Career
Born in Lviv, Mykhayliv is a product of the local Lviv youth sportive school system.

He played for Lviv in the Ukrainian Premier League Reserves and in September 2022 Mykhayliv was promoted to the senior squad of this team. He made his debut in the Ukrainian Premier League for Lviv as a second half-time substituted player on 11 September 2022, playing in a losing away match against Dynamo Kyiv.

References

External links

2005 births
Living people
Sportspeople from Lviv
Ukrainian footballers
Association football midfielders
FC Lviv players
Ukrainian Premier League players